Acta Materialia is a peer-reviewed scientific journal published twenty times per year on behalf of Acta Materialia Inc. The current publisher is Elsevier. The coordinating editor is Christopher A. Schuh, Danae and Vasilis Salapatas Professor of Metallurgy at the Massachusetts Institute of Technology. The journal covers research on all aspects of the structure and properties of materials and publishes original papers and commissioned reviews called Overviews.

History 
The journal was established in 1953 as Acta Metallurgica and renamed to Acta Metallurgica et Materialia in 1990, before obtaining its current name in 1996. Since 1956, it has been published by Pergamon Press, with the imprint being retained for some time after the acquisition by Elsevier. It incorporates Nanostructured Materials that was published independently from 1992 to 1999. Scripta Materialia was established in 1967 as a companion journal, publishing rapid communications as well as opinion articles called Viewpoints.

Abstracting and indexing 
The journal is abstracted and indexed in:

According to the Journal Citation Reports, the journal has a 2020 impact factor of 8.203.

See also 
Physical metallurgy
Materials Science

References

External links 
 
Acta Materialia Open Access Articles

Biweekly journals
Elsevier academic journals
English-language journals
Materials science journals
Publications established in 1953
Publications established in 1992
Publications disestablished in 1999